Gravity's Rim (Instrumental Version) is a studio album by Vampire Rodents, released on July 20, 2018 by Rodentia Productions. It contains non-vocal versions of tracks from Vampire Rodents sixth studio album Gravity's Rim, including the tracks "Blind Acceleration", originally from the 1996 various artists compilation album Fascist Communist Revolutionaries, and "Smartass", an unreleased track listed on the album's back cover as its coda. Composer Daniel Vahnke had originally planned to issue the music on compact disc in late 1996 or early in 1997 but Fifth Colvmn Records went bankrupt and album's release date was cancelled.

Track listing

Personnel
Adapted from the Gravity's Rim (Instrumental Version) liner notes.

Axon Tremolo
 Daniel Vahnke – sampler, guitar, bass guitar

Additional performers
 Chase – percussion loops

Production
 Judson Leach – mixing (5, 6, 12, 14, 21, 22), mastering (22)
 Neil Wojewodzki – mastering, editing (2, 4, 5, 7-9, 11, 15, 16-19, 24), mixing (1-4, 7-11, 13, 15-19, 20, 23, 24)

Release history

References

External links 
 Gravity's Rim (Instrumental Version) at Bandcamp
 Gravity's Rim (Instrumental Version) at iTunes

2018 albums
Instrumental albums
Vampire Rodents albums